Trunzo is a surname. Notable people with the surname include:

Amanda Trunzo (born 1989), American women's ice hockey player
Caesar Trunzo (1926–2013), American politician